This is a list of cricket teams that have played in top-level domestic competitions (First-Class, List A and T20) in Pakistan.

Regional domestic teams (men)

As of 2019, domestic cricket in Pakistan was reorganised into six regional teams (on provincial lines). A three tier bottom-up system is in operation with the Tier 1 teams participating in the Quaid-e-Azam Trophy (First Class), Pakistan Cup (List A) and National T20 Cup (Regional T20). The Tier 2 teams participate in the City Cricket Association Tournament whilst the Tier 3 teams participate in various local tournaments as both tiers feed players to the Tier 1 team. 

 

 
Quetta
Pishin
Sibi
Noshki
Killa Abdullah
Naseerabad
Loralai
Gwadar
Panjgur
Turbat
Khuzdar
Jaffarabad & Lasbela
 
 Various local clubs, schools and colleges

 

 
Lahore (East)
Lahore (West)
Lahore (North)
Gujranwala
Sheikhupura
Kasur
Sialkot
Narowal
Hafizabad
Gujrat
Mandi Bahauddin
Faisalabad
Sargodha
Mianwali
Jhang & Bhakkar
 
 Various local clubs, schools and colleges

 

 
Nowshehra
Charsadda
Swat
Lower Dir
Mardan
Abbottabad
Mansehra
Haripur
Swabi
Upper Dir
Buner
Khyber
Mamond
Kohat
Kurram
D.I.Khan
Bannu & Mohmand
 
 Various local clubs, schools and colleges

 

Rawalpindi
Attock
Jhelum
Chakwal
Muzaffarabad
Kotli
Islamabad
Mirpur
Gilgit-Baltistan
Poonch & Bagh
 
 Various local clubs, schools and colleges

 

 
Karachi (Zone I)
Karachi (Zone II)
Karachi (Zone III)
Karachi (Zone IV)
Karachi (Zone V)
Karachi (Zone VI)
Karachi (Zone VII)
Hyderabad
Jamshoro
Mirpur Khas
Badin
Sanghar
Sukkur
Shikarpur
Khairpur
Larkana & Benazirabad
 
 Various local clubs, schools and colleges

 

 
Sahiwal
Lodhran
Okara
Multan
Vehari
Khanewal
D.G.Khan
Bahawalnagar
R.Y.Khan
Layyah
Pakpattan
Muzaffargarh
Bahawalpur & Layyah
 
 Various local clubs, schools and colleges

Franchise teams (men)

Pakistan Super League
The Pakistan Super League (PSL) is a Franchise T20 tournament and is competed between six city-based franchise teams:

Karachi Kings
Islamabad United
Peshawar Zalmi
Quetta Gladiators
Lahore Qalandars
Multan Sultans

Kashmir Premier League
The Kashmir Premier League (KPL) is a Franchise T20 tournament and is competed between seven franchise teams representing the Kashmir region:
Muzaffarabad Tigers
Rawalakot Hawks
Bagh Stallions
Mirpur Royals
Kotli Lions
Overseas Warriors
Jammu Janbaz

Pakistan Junior League
The Pakistan Junior League (PJL) is a professional 20-over cricket league contested by Under-19 teams representing different cities of Pakistan:
Bahawalpur Royals
Gujranwala Giants
Gwadar Sharks
Hyderabad Hunters
Mardan Warriors
Rawalpindi Raiders

Domestic teams (women)
 PCB Blasters
 PCB Challengers
 PCB Dynamites
 PCB Strikers

Former and defunct teams

Provinces and federal territories

Balochistan cricket team
Federal Areas cricket team
Khyber Pakhtunkhwa cricket team
Punjab cricket team
Sindh cricket team

Associations
The associations represent regions, districts and cities. Districts and cities are listed below their parent region, with T20 teams in parentheses.

Abbottabad cricket team (Abbottabad Falcons)
Azad Jammu and Kashmir (AJK Jaguars)
Bahawalpur cricket team (Bahawalpur Stags)
Dera Murad Jamali (Dera Murad Jamali Ibexes)
Faisalabad cricket team (Faisalabad Wolves)
Sargodha cricket team
Federally Administered Tribal Areas cricket team (FATA Cheetas)
Dera Ismail Khan cricket team
Hyderabad cricket team (Hyderabad Hawks)
Islamabad cricket team (Islamabad Leopards)
Karachi cricket teams (Karachi Dolphins, Karachi Zebras)
Lahore cricket teams (Lahore Eagles, Lahore Lions)
Larkana (Larkana Bulls)
Dadu cricket team
Khairpur cricket team
Sukkur cricket team
Multan cricket team (Multan Tigers)
Peshawar cricket team (Peshawar Panthers)
Quetta cricket team (Quetta Bears)
Hazara cricket team
Kalat cricket team
Rawalpindi cricket team (Rawalpindi Rams)
Sialkot cricket team (Sialkot Stallions)
Gujranwala cricket team
Sheikhupura cricket team

Departments and educational institutions

 Allied Bank Limited cricket team
 Attock Group cricket team
 Combined Services (Pakistan) cricket team
 Dawood Industries cricket team
 Defence Housing Authority cricket team
 Lahore Education Board cricket team
 Habib Bank Limited cricket team
 House Building Finance Corporation cricket team
 Income Tax Department cricket team
 Industrial Development Bank of Pakistan cricket team
 Karachi Education Board cricket team
 Karachi Port Trust cricket team
 Karachi University cricket team
 Khan Research Laboratories cricket team
 Muslim Commercial Bank cricket team
 National Bank of Pakistan cricket team
 Pakistan Air Force cricket team
 Pakistan Automobiles Corporation cricket team
 Pakistan Combined Schools
 Pakistan Customs cricket team
 Pakistan International Airlines cricket team
 Pakistan National Shipping Corporation cricket team
 Pakistan Railways cricket team
 Pakistan Security Printing Corporation cricket team
 Pakistan Steel cricket team
 Pakistan Telecommunication Company Limited cricket team
 Pakistan Television cricket team
 Pakistan Universities cricket team
 Pakistan University Grants Commission cricket team
 Port Qasim Authority cricket team
 Public Works Department cricket team
 Punjab University cricket team
 Redco Pakistan Limited cricket team
 Service Industries cricket team
 State Bank of Pakistan cricket team
 Sui Northern Gas Pipelines Limited cricket team
 Sui Southern Gas Company cricket team
 United Bank Limited cricket team
 Water and Power Development Authority cricket team
 Zarai Taraqiati Bank Limited cricket team

Other

Afghan Cheetahs (T20)
Central Zone cricket team
East Pakistan first-class cricket teams
Rest of Baluchistan cricket team
Rest of North West Frontier Province cricket team
Rest of Punjab cricket team
Rest of Sindh cricket team

Notes

References

Pakistani cricket teams
Teams